Robert Aldworth (c 1624 – 20 March 1676) was an English politician who sat in the House of Commons between 1654 and 1660.

Aldworth was the son of Richard Aldworth of Bristol who was an alderman and MP for Bristol in 1646. He matriculated at Lincoln College, Oxford on  6 July 1638, aged 14. Aldworth was called to the bar at Lincoln's Inn in 1647.

In 1654, Aldworth was elected Member of Parliament for Bristol in the First Protectorate Parliament. He was re-elected MP for Bristol in 1656 and 1659 for the Second and Third Protectorate Parliaments.

In 1660, Aldworth was elected MP for Devizes in the Convention Parliament.

Aldworth was  treasurer of Lincoln's Inn in 1674.

References

 

1624 births
1676 deaths
Alumni of Lincoln College, Oxford
English MPs 1654–1655
English MPs 1656–1658
English MPs 1659
English MPs 1660
Members of Lincoln's Inn